"Need You Now" is a song recorded by American country music trio Lady A (known at the time as "Lady Antebellum"). The band co-wrote the song with Josh Kear, and produced it with Paul Worley. It serves as the lead-off single and title track to their second studio album of the same name, and was first released in the US on August 11, 2009, and it features lead vocals from both Scott and Kelley. The song also served as their debut single in the UK and Europe, where it was released May 3, 2010. It won four Grammy Awards in 2011, including for Song of the Year and Record of the Year, the only country song to win both honors since "Not Ready to Make Nice" by the Dixie Chicks won in 2006.

The song spent five weeks at No. 1 on the Billboard Hot Country Songs chart in late 2009. Thereafter, "Need You Now" crossed over onto various pop and adult contemporary music charts, becoming a top five hit in Canada, Ireland, and New Zealand, as well as a top ten hit in the Netherlands and Norway. The song won Single of the Year and Song of the Year at the 2010 Academy of Country Music Awards, as well as Group Video of the Year at the 2010 CMT Music Awards. For the chart week of November 30, 2010, the song became the group's highest-charting single on the Billboard Hot 100, reaching No. 2, the best position for a country song by a band on that chart since Lonestar's "Amazed" topped the tally at the beginning of the decade. The single has been certified nine times platinum by the Recording Industry Association of America (RIAA). It's the band's only song to crack the Billboard Decade End, doing so at number 68.

A music video was shot for the song, directed by Dave McClister. In the video the song has an extended piano intro, and features all members of the group acting out scenes related to the storyline. The song was initially released only to the country radio format in the United States and Canada on August 24, 2009, but was remixed and re-released to all other formats domestically and internationally at the beginning of 2010. The song gained prominence internationally, in Europe and South America. The trio re-recorded the song again in Simlish to accompany the release of the Sims 3 expansion pack Ambitions. By April 17, 2011, the song became the ninth most downloaded song in history, moving five million copies, and surpassed Taylor Swift's "Love Story" as the most downloaded country song in history. It has since sold over 6 million copies in the US.

The song was used in television series such as Hellcats and The Glades. "Need You Now" has also been covered by several artists, including Adele with Darius Rucker, Boyce Avenue and Glee Cast. "Weird Al" Yankovic included the chorus in "Polka Face", the polka medley from his 2011 album Alpocalypse.

Content
The lyrics describe placing a call to someone in the middle of the night due to being lonely and longing for companionship. Hillary Scott commented on the song, saying that "All three of us know what it's like to get to that point where you feel lonely enough that you make a late-night phone call that you very well could regret the next day." Charles Kelley told The Boot that the band's record executives initially had concerns regarding using the lyrics "I'm a little drunk", but he convinced the executives to leave the content in the song.

Critical reception
"Need You Now" has received critical acclaim from music critics and is considered one of the best country songs of the 2000s. It won the 2011 Grammy award for Record of the Year and Song of the Year. 

The song received a "thumbs up" review from Jim Malec of the 9513. He said that although Charles Kelley's voice had a "surprisingly stuffy tone," lead singer Hillary Scott's voice fit perfectly for "dark" songs like "Need You Now." He said that both singers had a rawness in their voices that made the song feel "real".

The track received a positive review from Ken Tucker of Billboard, who said, "the song finds alto Scott trading lead vocals with a soulful Kelley, and it will connect with anyone who's ever dumped a significant other and regretted it in the early morning hours." 

Bobby Peacock of Roughstock gave a positive review as well, comparing its sound favorably to that of "I Run to You." He also thought the traded-off lead vocals gave the song "more depth," and that Kelley and Scott sang more strongly than on the debut album.

Critics in Europe and North America have pointed to similarities between "Need You Now" and "Eye in the Sky" by The Alan Parsons Project.

Chart performance

The song became the trio's second number one hit on the Hot Country Songs chart dated November 28, 2009, where it stayed for five weeks, making it the first song to hold the number one position for more than four weeks since Taylor Swift's "Our Song" spent six weeks at number one between December 2007 and January 2008. In the Billboard Hot 100 chart, the song peaked at number two and stayed there for two weeks, making it their highest-charting single on that chart and their first Top 5. The song also peaked at No. 2 on the Canadian Hot 100, making it their highest-charting and first Top 5 single there as well. "Need You Now" is only the second country song to reach number one on the Billboard Adult Top 40 chart, the first being Faith Hill's "Breathe", which reached that same position in 2000. For the Billboard tracking period of March 29 – April 4, 2010, "Need You Now" broke the record held by Hoobastank's hit "The Reason" for most spins in one week on the Adult Top 40 chart. The song debuted at No. 28 on the UK Singles Chart in its first week of release. It was covered in a live performance for Queen Elizabeth II's Diamond Jubilee Concert in June 2012 by English singers Gary Barlow and Cheryl Cole which saw the song re-enter the UK Charts. Over a month later it climbed to No. 15, its highest UK chart position and after 53 weeks in the chart.

On December 9, 2010, the song was named the No. 2 Hot 100 song of the year by Billboard, behind "Tik Tok" by Kesha, marking the highest position a country song has ever reached since Faith Hill's "Breathe" was ranked No. 1 in the year-end chart of the year 2000.

In April 2011, "Need You Now" replaced Taylor Swift's "Love Story" as the best-selling country song of all time in the U.S. It is also the second country song to sell over 5 million digital copies (after Swift's "Love Story"). It has sold over 6 million copies by January 2013, the first country song to do so. As of June 2016, it had sold 6.7 million units in the U.S.

Due to the band winning four Grammys, "Need You Now" debuted at No. 32 on the German Singles Chart in February 2011, 10 months after the digital release of the single. Before that happened, the song did not sell enough to enter the chart.

Music video

David McClister directed the "Need You Now" music video, using a treatment he wrote in 10 minutes.

The video features all three members of Lady Antebellum acting out scenes pertaining to the storyline. It begins in a hallway of a hotel where Kelley is sitting against a wall and Scott is in her room, with Haywood playing the piano. Kelley goes to a cafe and has a coffee, where Haywood arrives with his love interest. Scott then leaves her room and hails a taxi. Kelley leaves the cafe and goes outside to walk to a costume ball, to which Scott is also traveling. When they arrive at the ball, they both see their love interests wearing masks and embrace them. Haywood soon arrives at the ball with his love interest. The video ends with all three members embracing their love interests. The video was filmed at the King Edward Hotel in Toronto, Ontario.

Of the changes between the song and its music video, one of the most noted is Kelley drinking coffee instead of whiskey, since the song states the character is intoxicated. In response, McClister admitted he simply did not want the video to be a literal adaptation of the song, as he felt sitting in a diner in the middle of the night was lonelier.

Cover versions and media usage
In December 2010, Adele and Darius Rucker performed the song at the CMT Artists of the Year. The song was featured in the 2012 film Zero Dark Thirty. The song is featured in the first episode of Hellcats, and it also appeared in episode 12 of The Glades. "Weird Al" Yankovic included the chorus in "Polka Face", the polka medley from his 2011 album Alpocalypse. Gary Barlow and Cheryl performed the song at the Diamond Jubilee concert at Buckingham Palace on 4th June 2012.

In 2017, Shane Filan of Westlife included this song on his album Love Always which reached Top 3 in Scottish Albums Chart and Top 5 in UK Albums Chart and Irish Albums Chart. This was released as a promotional single in East Asia (with a new arrangement and a duet with a Filipina bossa nova music artist Sitti), and it charted in iTunes Top Songs in Laos, Philippines, Indonesia, Vietnam, Cambodia, and Malaysia. A version of the song by Filan with Indonesian pop star Anggun was released for the Asia Deluxe Edition of the Love Always album in July 2018. Another cover, by Johnny Gioeli and Deen Castronovo featuring Giorgia Colleluori, was released in 2018.

Track listing
Digital download
 "Need You Now" – 3:57

Other versions
 "Need You Now"  – 3:31
 "Need You Now"  – 3:33
 "Need You Now"  – 3:29
 "Need You Now"  – 4:22
52nd Annual Grammy Awards
 "Need You Now"
53rd Annual Grammy Awards
 "If You Don't Know Me by Now/American Honey/Need You Now"

Credits and personnel
Adapted from the album liner notes.
Chad Cromwell – drums
Jason "Slim" Gambill – electric guitar
Dave Haywood – background vocals, acoustic guitar
Charles Kelley – lead vocals
Rob McNelley – electric guitar 
Michael Rojas – piano, synthesizer
Hillary Scott – lead vocals
Paul Worley – acoustic guitar, electric guitar
Craig Young – bass guitar

Awards and nominations

Charts

Weekly charts

Monthly charts

Year-end charts

Decade-end charts

All-time charts

Certifications

Release history

See also
 List of best-selling singles
 List of best-selling singles in the United States
 List of Billboard Adult Contemporary number ones of 2010

References

External links
 Lady Antebellum "Need You Now" music video at CMT.com

2000s ballads
2009 singles
2010 singles
2009 songs
Lady A songs
Songs written by Josh Kear
Country ballads
Number-one singles in Israel
Grammy Award for Record of the Year
Grammy Award for Song of the Year
Song recordings produced by Paul Worley
Songs written by Hillary Scott
Songs written by Charles Kelley
Songs written by Dave Haywood
Capitol Records Nashville singles
Songs about alcohol
Songs about loneliness
Male–female vocal duets
Shane Filan songs
Anggun songs
Adele songs